The 2019 Dutch Darts Masters was the seventh of thirteen PDC European Tour events on the 2019 PDC Pro Tour. The tournament took place at IJsselhallen, Zwolle, Netherlands, from 24 to 26 May 2019. It featured a field of 48 players and £140,000 in prize money, with £25,000 going to the winner.

Michael van Gerwen was the defending champion after defeating Steve Lennon 8–5 in the final of the 2018 tournament.

However, Ian White ended Van Gerwen's five-year winning run in the tournament by beating him 8–7 in the final to win his third European Tour title.

The result also ended Van Gerwen's 28-game winning streak in European Tour last-leg deciders.

Prize money
This is how the prize money is divided:

 Seeded players who lose in the second round do not receive this prize money on any Orders of Merit.

Qualification and format
The top 16 entrants from the PDC ProTour Order of Merit on 7 May will automatically qualify for the event and will be seeded in the second round.

The remaining 32 places will go to players from six qualifying events – 18 from the UK Tour Card Holder Qualifier (held on 17 May), six from the European Tour Card Holder Qualifier (held on 17 May), two from the West & South European Associate Member Qualifier (held on 18 May), four from the Host Nation Qualifier (held on 23 May), one from the Nordic & Baltic Associate Member Qualifier (held on 8 March) and one from the East European Associate Member Qualifier (held on 10 March).

From 2019, the Host Nation, Nordic & Baltic and East European Qualifiers will only be available to non-tour card holders. Any tour card holders from the applicable regions will have to play the main European Qualifier.

Rob Cross, who was set to be the 7th seed, withdrew prior to the tournament. All seeds below him moved up a place, with Michael Smith becoming sixteenth seed, and an extra place being made available in the Host Nation Qualifier.

James Wade, the 5th seed, withdrew from the tournament after the draw and was not replaced, with his second round opponent Glen Durrant receiving a bye.

The following players will take part in the tournament:

Top 16
  Michael van Gerwen (runner-up)
  Ian White (champion)
  Daryl Gurney (second round)
  Gerwyn Price (semi-finals)
  James Wade (withdrew)
  Peter Wright (quarter-finals)
  Mensur Suljović (second round)
  Dave Chisnall (quarter-finals)
  Ricky Evans (third round)
  Joe Cullen (second round)
  Simon Whitlock (third round)
  Jonny Clayton (second round)
  Stephen Bunting (second round)
  Darren Webster (second round)
  Jermaine Wattimena (third round)
  Michael Smith (second round)

UK Qualifier
  Steve Beaton (second round)
  Nathan Aspinall (first round)
  Mervyn King (quarter-finals)
  Ryan Harrington (first round)
  Harry Ward (first round)
  Mickey Mansell (second round)
  Ritchie Edhouse (second round)
  Keegan Brown (first round)
  Ross Smith (first round)
  Glen Durrant (quarter-finals)
  Luke Woodhouse (first round)
  William O'Connor (second round)
  Alan Norris (first round)
  Kyle Anderson (first round)
  Brendan Dolan (third round)
  Andy Boulton (first round)
  Ryan Joyce (first round)

European Qualifier
  Rowby-John Rodriguez (third round)
  Krzysztof Ratajski (second round)
  Danny Noppert (second round)
  Max Hopp (third round)
  Raymond van Barneveld (third round)
  Vincent van der Voort (quarter-finals)

West/South European Qualifier
  Mike De Decker (first round)
  Florian Hempel (second round)

Host Nation Qualifier
  Erik Hol (first round)
  Jimmy Hendriks (first round)
  Danny van Trijp (second round)
  Wesley Plaisier (first round)
  Alexander Merkx (first round)

Nordic & Baltic Qualifier
  Dennis Nilsson (third round)

East European Qualifier
  Pál Székely (first round)

Draw

References

2019 PDC Pro Tour
2019 PDC European Tour
2019 in Dutch sport
May 2019 sports events in the Netherlands